Massimo Pellegrini (born 2 January 1966 in Frascati) is a retired Italian professional footballer who played as a midfielder.

1966 births
Living people
People from Frascati
Italian footballers
Serie A players
Serie B players
Serie C players
Inter Milan players
A.C. Monza players
Cagliari Calcio players
S.P.A.L. players
A.C. Ancona players
Empoli F.C. players
Modena F.C. players
Novara F.C. players
U.S. Sassuolo Calcio players
Association football midfielders
Footballers from Lazio
Sportspeople from the Metropolitan City of Rome Capital